The Heavenly Market Enclosure (天市垣, Tian Shi Yuan), is one of the San Yuan or Three enclosures. Stars and constellations of this group are visible during late summer and early autumn in the Northern Hemisphere (late winter and early spring in the Southern). The Summer Triangle lies directly to the northeast.

Asterisms

The asterisms are :

See also 

 Twenty-eight mansions
 Summer Triangle

Chinese constellations